Bunso (The Youngest) is a documentary by Filipino filmmakers Ditsi Carolino and Nana Buxani.

Plot
Three boys, Tony, 13, Diosel, and Bunso, 11, are struggling to survive in a crowded Cebu Provincial Detention and Rehabilitation Center in Cebu, alongside adult rapists and murderers. The two street-smart boys paint a picture of the world of children caught between extreme poverty and the law.

Release
Bunso was shown in December 2004 on a limited screening. In November 2004, it had its offshore world premiere at the International Documentary Film Festival Amsterdam in the Netherlands where it was shown as part of the non-competition Reflecting Images section.

Awards
Ditsi Carolino received the Best Director award for the documentary film Bunso (The Youngest) at the OneWorld 2005 documentary films festival held in Prague, Czech Republic.

 Best Director—One World Film Festival, Prague
 Grand Prix—EBS International Documentary Festival, Seoul
 Youth Jury Prize—Perspektive - Filmfestival der Menschenrechte, Nuremberg
 Best Short Film, Gawad Urian

References

External links

Ma-Yi Theater Company, newsletter

Documentary films about child abuse
Documentary films about the penal system
Philippine documentary films
2005 films
2005 documentary films
2000s Tagalog-language films
Filipino-language films
Penal system in the Philippines
2000s English-language films